Selbach is a municipality in western Germany.

Selbach may also refer to:

Places
Selbach, Rio Grande do Sul, a municipality in Brazil

Given name
Selbach mac Ferchair (died 730), Irish king

Surname
Gustavo Selbach (born 1974), Brazilian slalom canoer
Jopie Selbach (1918–1998), Dutch swimmer
Kip Selbach (1872–1956), American baseball player
Leonardo Selbach (born 1971), Brazilian slalom canoer, brother of Gustavo Selbach
Toetie Selbach (born 1934), Dutch Olympic gymnast
Tootje Selbach (born 1928), Dutch Olympic gymnast, sister of Toetie Selbach
Udo Sellbach (1927-2006), German-Australian visual artist and educator